Tischeria urticicolella is a moth of the family Tischeriidae. It is known from the Democratic Republic of Congo.

The larvae feed on Laportea podocarpa. They probably mine the leaves of their host plant.

References

Tischeriidae
Insects of the Democratic Republic of the Congo
Moths of Africa
Endemic fauna of the Democratic Republic of the Congo
Moths described in 1940